Lucas Da Silva Xavier (born 26 July 1994 in São Paulo, Brazil) is a Brazilian professional footballer who plays for Mineros de Zacatecas of Ascenso MX.

Career

FC Juárez
On 13 January 2017, Lucas Xavier signed a ten-month contract with FC Juárez.

Clausura 2017 

Lucas Xavier made his debut for FC Juárez on 11 February 2017 in Ascenso MX, against Coras de Tepic, as a second-half substitute for Sidnei Sciola. He scored his first goal in the 91st minute to win the match.

On 15 February 2017, Lucas Xavier was a starter for the first time with FC Juárez at home against Dorados de Sinaloa in the Copa MX. He scored in the 19th minute in a 2-1 victory.

Lucas Xavier was a starter for the first time in the league against Loros de Colima on 4 March 2017. Lucas Xavier scored his third goal for FC Juárez against Alebrijes de Oaxaca in a 3-2 loss on 10 March 2017. On 15 March 2017, Lucas Xavier scored twice against C.D. Guadalajara in a 3-2 loss in the Copa MX quarter-finals. On 29 April 2017, Lucas Xavier scored twice in FC Juárez' 2-0 win over Dorados de Sinaloa in the second leg of the Liguilla semi-finals.

Mineros de Zacatecas
In January 2020 it was confirmed, that Lucas had joined Ascenso MX club Mineros de Zacatecas.

References

External links
Player profile

1994 births
Living people
Brazilian footballers
Brazilian expatriate footballers
Liga MX players
Ascenso MX players
FC Juárez footballers
Mineros de Zacatecas players
Footballers from São Paulo
Brazilian expatriate sportspeople in Mexico
Expatriate footballers in Mexico
Association football midfielders